Tritia pfeifferi is a species of sea snail, a marine gastropod mollusk in the family Nassariidae, the Nassa mud snails or dog whelks.

Description
The shell size varies between 9 mm and 19 mm

Distribution
This species is occurs in the Atlantic Ocean off Spain, Portugal and Mauritania.

References

 Cernohorsky W. O. (1984). Systematics of the family Nassariidae (Mollusca: Gastropoda). Bulletin of the Auckland Institute and Museum 14: 1-356
 Wolff, W.J.; Duiven, P.; Esselink, P.; Gueve, A. (1993). Biomass of macrobenthic tidal flat fauna of the Banc d'Arguin, Mauritania. Hydrobiologia 258(1-3): 151-163
 Gofas, S.; Le Renard, J.; Bouchet, P. (2001). Mollusca, in: Costello, M.J. et al. (Ed.) (2001). European register of marine species: a check-list of the marine species in Europe and a bibliography of guides to their identification. Collection Patrimoines Naturels, 50: pp. 180–213
 Segers W., Rolan E. & Swinnen F. (2008) Study and separation of two species treated as Nassarius pfeifferi (Philippi, 1844) (Neogastropoda, Nassariidae). Visaya 2(3): 18–28.

External links
 

pfeifferi
Gastropods described in 1844
Taxa named by Rodolfo Amando Philippi